The 1896–97 Irish Cup was the seventeenth edition of the premier knock-out cup competition in Irish football. 

Cliftonville won the tournament for the third time, defeating Sherwood Foresters (a British Army team) 3–1 in the final.

Results
Belfast and Dublin clubs were given a bye until the second round.

First round

|}

Second round

|}

Third round

|}

Replay

|}

Semi-finals

|}

Final

References

External links
 Northern Ireland Cup Finals. Rec.Sport.Soccer Statistics Foundation (RSSSF)

Irish Cup seasons
1896–97 domestic association football cups
1896–97 in Irish association football